Holme Valley is a civil parish in the metropolitan borough of Kirklees, West Yorkshire, England. It contains 449 listed buildings that are recorded in the National Heritage List for England. Of these, one is listed at Grade II*, the middle of the three grades, and the others are at Grade II, the lowest grade. Holme Valley is a large parish to the south of Huddersfield, and is largely rural. The largest settlement is the small town of Holmfirth, and smaller settlements include Honley and Brockholes to the north, and New Mill, Totties, Jackson Bridge, Hepworth, Hade Edge and Burnlee to the east and south.

Until the Industrial Revolution the economy of the parish depended mainly on agriculture, and many of the listed buildings are farmhouses and farm buildings.  The Industrial Revolution brought the woollen industry to the area, and this was initially a domestic process. A high proportion of the listed buildings are weavers' cottages and other houses used for spinning wool, and these are characterised by long rows of mullioned windows, mainly in the upper storeys, and containing as many as 14 lights. Most of the listed buildings are constructed from stone, in particular millstone grit, and have roofs of stone slate. The other listed buildings include churches, chapels and associated structures, items in churchyards, schools, public houses, shops, bridges over the River Holme and its tributaries, a pinfold, monuments, including a war memorial, milestones and mileposts, boundary markers, a civic hall, remaining parts of corn and woollen mills, a pair of wells and a pair of stone troughs, a cinema, and telephone kiosks.

This list contains the listed buildings in the areas outside the town of Holmfirth, and includes the villages of Brockholes, Hade Edge, Hepworth, Honley, Jackson Bridge, New Mill, and Totties. The listed buildings in and near Holmfirth are included in Listed buildings in Holme Valley (central area).


Key

Buildings

References

Citations

Sources

Lists of listed buildings in West Yorkshire
Listed